Depot Historic District or Depot Square Historic District may refer to:

 Depot-Compress Historic District, Holly Springs, Mississippi, listed on the National Register of Historic Places (NRHP) in Marshall County, Mississippi
 Meridian Depot Historic District, listed on the NRHP in Mississippi
 Depot Historic District (Marion, North Carolina), listed on the NRHP in North Carolina
 Depot Historic District (Raleigh, North Carolina), listed on the NRHP in North Carolina
 Depot Square Historic District (Wichita Falls, Texas), listed on the NRHP in Wichita County, Texas
 Depot Square Historic District (Randolph, Vermont), listed on the NRHP in Orange County, Vermont